Felice Gremo (23 December 1901 – 6 February 1994) was an Italian racing cyclist. He rode in the 1930 Tour de France.

References

External links
 

1901 births
1994 deaths
Italian male cyclists
Place of birth missing
Cyclists from Turin